Jeff Thomas (born June 17, 1998) is an American football wide receiver who is a free agent. He played college football at the University of Miami and signed with the New England Patriots as an undrafted free agent in 2020.

Early years
Thomas attended and played high school football at East St. Louis Senior High School from 2013 to 2016.

College career
Thomas enrolled at the University of Miami on May 22, 2017, where he played from 2017 to 2019. Thomas finished with 17 receptions for 374 yards and two touchdowns his freshman season. Thomas improved on this his sophomore season, finishing with 35 receptions for 563 yards and three touchdowns, however his season was cut short when he was dismissed from the Miami team prior to week 12 after an argument with wide receivers coach Ron Dugans. After his dismissal from the team, Thomas looked to transfer to Illinois but wound up deciding to stay at Miami after head coach Mark Richt retired on December 30, 2018. Thomas played the majority of the his junior year at Miami, finishing the season with 31 receptions for 379 yards and three touchdowns, however he was suspended weeks seven and eight due to a violation of team rules. Following his junior season, Thomas declared for the 2020 NFL Draft.

College career statistics

Professional career

New England Patriots
Thomas signed with the New England Patriots as an undrafted free agent in 2020. On September 5, 2020, he was waived by the team during final roster cuts.

Pittsburgh Maulers
On February 23, 2022, Thomas was drafted in the 15th round of the 2022 USFL Draft to the Pittsburgh Maulers. He was transferred to the team's inactive roster on April 22, 2022, due to a groin injury. He was transferred to the active roster on April 30. He was moved back to the inactive roster with a hamstring injury. He was released on May 19, 2022.

Birmingham Stallions
Thomas was claimed off waivers by the Birmingham Stallions on May 19, 2022, and subsequently moved to the inactive roster the next day. He was transferred to the active roster on May 21. On March 11, 2023, Davis was released by the Stallions.

References

External links
New England Patriots bio
Miami Hurricanes bio

1998 births
Living people
American football wide receivers
Miami Hurricanes football players
New England Patriots players
sportspeople from East St. Louis, Illinois
Players of American football from Illinois
Pittsburgh Maulers (2022) players
Birmingham Stallions (2022) players